Anna Murphy may refer to:

 Anna Murphy (musician), (born 1989), Swiss musician and former member of the folk metal band Eluveitie
 Anna Murphy (producer), (born 1969), Scottish film producer
 Anna Murphy (scientist), biography in chapter 10 of Woman in Science, published 1913